Marinococcus tarijensis is a Gram-positive, coccoid-shaped and moderately halophilic bacterium from the genus of Marinococcus which has been isolated from a salt crystal from a salt mine in Tarija in Bolivia.

References

 

Bacillaceae
Bacteria described in 2013